The Government Polytechnic, Balasore is a State Government run diploma engineering school. It is established in 2013 by the Directorate of Technical Education & Vocational Training(DTET), Orissa. It started with all the new Government Polytechnics in Orissa at a time.

Campus 
The campus of the institution is located just 4 km from N.H. no 16 and 12 km from Balasore town. But the Institution situated in a good environment for education area.

 Electrical Engineering
 Electronics & Telecommunication Engineering
 Mechanical Engineering
 Civil engineering

Admissions 
Students can get admission to this institute by getting rank in Diploma Entrance Test organises every year by SCTE & VT. There is two categories available for admission. That are freshers entry after Matriculation(10th) & 20% seat are reserved for admission in two 2nd year or Third semester directly after ITI or +2 Science .

Training and placement 
The institution runs all the training curriculum as per the norms of SCTE & VT & Govt. of Odisha. As its final students are not graduated till now the placement strategies are not available still now. But the placement cell is available in the institution.

References

External links 
 

Technical universities and colleges in Odisha
Education in Balasore district
Educational institutions established in 2013
2013 establishments in Odisha